Performance Today is a Peabody Award-winning classical music radio program, first aired in 1987 and hosted since 2000 by Fred Child. It is the most listened-to daily classical music radio program in the United States, with 1.2 million listeners on 237 stations. The program builds its two-hour daily broadcast (some stations broadcast only one hour) from  live concert performances from around the world. Performance Today is based at the American Public Media (APM) studios in Saint Paul, Minnesota, but is frequently on the road, with special programs broadcast from festivals and public radio stations around the country.

In addition to live concert performances, the show airs in-studio performances and interviews. Weekly features include the "Piano Puzzler" with composer Bruce Adolphe.

Through the PT Young Artist in Residence program, the show highlights young soloists from American conservatories who have the potential for great careers. Former Performance Today young artists include pianists Orli Shaham, Jeremy Denk, and Jonathan Biss, guitarist Jason Vieaux, and violinist Colin Jacobsen among many others.

History

Performance Today was created by National Public Radio (NPR), and went on the air in 1987. The program was founded by NPR vice president for cultural programming Dean Boal, who gave Performance Today its name, and who, along with NPR colleagues Doug Bennet, Jane Couch, Ellen Boal, and retired Baldwin Piano Company president Lucien Wulsin, secured the series' initial funding. NPR produced and distributed the program from Washington, D.C. until 2007. For most of its first two years, under executive producer Wesley Horner, and hosts Kathryn Loomans and Liane Hansen, it combined classical music with numerous and wide-ranging arts features. In 1989, the focus shifted exclusively to classical music. Martin Goldsmith then hosted for nearly ten years; he left in October 1999.  During Goldsmith's tenure as host the show grew from 40 stations to 230, with weekly listeners reaching 1.5 million. The show won a Peabody Award in 1998.
 
Fred Child has been the program's host since October 2000. In January 2007, American Public Media took over as the program's producer and distributor and moved the production to Saint Paul, Minnesota. In 2007, the show was awarded the Karl Haas Prize for Music Education by Fine Arts Radio International. And in 2014, Performance Today won a Gabriel Award for artistic achievement.

Piano Puzzler
The Piano Puzzler is a weekly feature on the show. Every week, composer Bruce Adolphe re-writes a familiar tune in the style of a classical composer; a listener then calls in to the show and listens to Bruce play the Puzzler of the week. The listener then tries to do two things: name the hidden tune, and name the composer whose style Bruce is mimicking. The Piano Puzzler is also available as a podcast.

Music is Music
Music is Music is a Performance Today podcast featuring composers and musicians steeped in the classical tradition, but determined to carve out a home for new music in the 21st century. Each new episode features artists talking about their craft and a sample of their work. Current episodes include conversations with Julia Holter, the Spektral Quartet, Third Coast Percussion, and members of Wilco, Stereolab, and Helado Negro.

Young Artists
Each year, Performance Today invites musicians from top American conservatories to visit the PT studios for a week-long residency. They join host Fred Child in the APM studio to play music, discuss their backgrounds, their ambitions, and what it means to be a musician.

Previous young artists have represented a variety of music schools including the New England Conservatory, the Curtis Institute of Music, the Jacobs School at the Indiana University, the Shepherd School of Music at Rice University, and The Colburn School. Former Performance Today young artists include pianists Orli Shaham, Jeremy Denk, and Jonathan Biss, guitarist Jason Vieaux, and violinist Colin Jacobsen among many others.

Classical Woman of the Year
Since 2019 Performance Today has chosen a Classical Woman of the Year based on a poll of listeners.  The awardees so far have been:
Valerie Coleman, 2019, a founder of the Imani Wind Quintet and active composer
JoAnn Faletta, 2020, conductor of the Buffalo Philharmonic orchestra
Marin Alsop, 2021, a major pioneer for women conductors and until recently conductor of the Baltimore Symphony Orchestra
Lara Downes, 2022, a pianist and a force in the popularization of black American classical music

See also
Fred Child
American Public Media

References

External links
 Performance Today Official site

Peabody Award-winning radio programs
American classical music radio programs
American Public Media programs
1987 radio programme debuts